Pierangelo Vignati (born 10 December 1970) is a former Italian paralympic cyclist who won a gold medal at the 2000 Summer Paralympics.

Biography
In 2021 he was technical commentator for cycling for RAI, alongside the commentator Stefano Rizzato, at the Tokyo 2020 Paralympics.

References

External links
 

1970 births
Living people
Sportspeople from Piacenza
Paralympic cyclists of Italy
Paralympic gold medalists for Italy
Medalists at the 2000 Summer Paralympics
Paralympic medalists in cycling
Cyclists at the 2000 Summer Paralympics
Cyclists at the 2004 Summer Paralympics